John Stuart (born January 24, 1920) is a Canadian male former weightlifter, who competed in the lightweight class and represented Canada at international competitions. He won the silver medal at the 1947 World Weightlifting Championships in the 67.5 kg category.

References

1920 births
Possibly living people
Canadian male weightlifters
Olympic weightlifters of Canada
Weightlifters at the 1948 Summer Olympics
Commonwealth Games competitors for Canada
Weightlifters at the 1950 British Empire Games
World Weightlifting Championships medalists
Date of birth missing
20th-century Canadian people
21st-century Canadian people